The Mayor of Bristol is the head of government of Bristol and the chief executive of the Bristol City Council. The mayor is a directly elected politician who, along with the 70 members of Bristol City Council, is responsible for the strategic government of the city of Bristol, England. The role was created after a local referendum held on 3 May 2012, which followed the passage of the Localism Act 2011. 41,032 voted for an elected mayor and 35,880 voted against, with a turnout of 24%. An election for the new post was held on 15 November 2012.

The incumbent mayor is Marvin Rees, elected on 5 May 2016.

The post of Lord Mayor of Bristol is a separate office, elected each May by city councillors and taking office on 29 September for a one-year period. The Lord Mayor chairs Council meetings and performs ceremonial functions in the city.

On 7 December 2021, Bristol City Council voted in favour of holding another referendum on the position of mayor in May 2022, with regards to whether to retain the position or return to decision-making by councillors. The referendum result was to abolish the position, and replace it with a committee system  at the end of the current mayoral term in May 2024.

Background

The Local Government Act 2000 required local authorities in the United Kingdom to move from the traditional committee-based system of decision making to one based on an executive, also allowing the possibility of a directly elected mayor. The first directly elected mayor was in Greater London in 2000. Others followed in other authorities, including Hartlepool, Middlesbrough, Tower Hamlets, Liverpool and Salford.

Referendum campaigns

2012 referendum
Following the passage of The City of Bristol (Mayoral Referendum) Order 2012 by the United Kingdom Parliament in February 2012, a referendum was announced for 3 May 2012. Nine other cities also held referendums on the same day: Birmingham, Bradford, Coventry, Leeds, Manchester, Newcastle upon Tyne, Nottingham, Sheffield and Wakefield. In addition, Doncaster Borough Council voted to hold a referendum on the same day to decide whether or not to retain their existing elected mayoral system, having been one of the earliest authorities to adopt the mayoral system in 2001.

Campaigning groups supporting (A Mayor for Bristol) and opposing (Bristol Says No!) an elected mayor were established.  A debate organised by the University of Bristol took place in the Council House on 22 February 2012.

During the campaign, there were complaints that many voters did not receive leaflets produced by the city council explaining what the referendum was about. Cities minister, Greg Clark accused the council of inaccuracies in the leaflet and refused to cover the printing costs. After Clark promised more powers would be available to Bristol with an elected mayor, the city council accused him of "blackmail".

The result, declared on 4 May 2012 by returning officer Stephen McNamara, was in favour of creating the position.  Bristol was the only one of the ten cities voting that day to choose to have an elected mayor.

2022 referendum
On 7 December 2021, the majority of elected Councillors backed a legally binding motion to hold a referendum on the future of the role of the Elected Mayor of Bristol. In May of 2022, the people of Bristol voted to abolish the role of mayor in the referendum. The position will cease to exist in 2024, at the end of Rees's second term.

Elections

The first election for the new post was held on 15 November 2012, the same day as elections for a police and crime commissioner for the Avon and Somerset Constabulary area. A number of potential candidates expressed and interest in standing, and 15 candidates stood for election to be mayor.

The supplementary vote system is used for the elections, with each voter being entitled to list a first and second choice candidate. In this system if no candidate has more than half of the votes plus one in the first round of counting, all candidates other than the top two are eliminated and voters' second choices from the eliminated candidates are then allocated to the remaining candidates. The second election for mayor of Bristol took place in May 2016.

2012

Turnout at the election was 27.92%.

2016

Turnout in the election was 44.87%.

2021
Because of the 2020 COVID-19 pandemic, elections for the mayor of Bristol were delayed from 2020 to May 2021. The mayoral term following these elections will be shortened by a year.

Turnout at the election was 41.15%.

List of mayors

See also
Politics of Bristol
Mayor of the West of England

References

Local government in Bristol
Bristol